Diabolik (also known as Saban's Diabolik and Diabolik: Track of the Panther, lit. "Diabolik: In the Footsteps of the Panther") is an animated television series based on the Italian comic book series of the same name by Angela and Luciana Giussani. Directed by Charles Corton, Jean-Luc Ayak and Thierry Coudert and written by Jean Cheville, Paul Diamond and Larry Brody, the series was an international co-production between Saban Entertainment, Saban International Paris, M6 Métropole Télévision and Mediaset, with Asiatic animation services by Ashi Productions and Saerom Animation. It premiered in Europe on Fox Kids on May 5, 1999, and lasted for 40 episodes before ending on January 1, 2001. 

Ownership of the series passed to Disney in 2001 when Disney acquired Fox Kids Worldwide, which also includes Saban Entertainment. The series is not available on Disney+. Although it was co-produced in the U.S., it never aired there in that country.

The series that focuses on master thief Diabolik and his woman companion Eva, as they fight the criminal organisation Brotherhood and its leader Dane, while evading Inspector Ginko. The series differs considerably from the darker-toned comic, making it more suitable for a young audience; the main differences include the rejuvenation of Diabolik and Eva Kant, the introduction of new characters (such as the main antagonist Dane), the replacement of Diabolik's Jaguar E-Type with a fictional modern car, the absence of murders by the title character, and the setting in the real world rather than fictional locations.

Plot 
Diabolik is a master thief with a deep knowledge in many scientific fields, including chemistry, mechanics, and computers. He has a set of lifelike masks which he uses to fool his opponents, assuming every identity at will. He was raised as an orphan on a secret island hideout of a criminal organisation known as the Brotherhood, where he learned all his criminal skills; as a baby, he was found abandoned on a boat by King, the leader of the organisation, and welcomed into his home like a son. Dane, King's legitimate son, never accepted him as a brother. Years later, Dane, jealous of Diabolik, framed him for a crime where he didn't commit (the murder of a man, the father of Diabolik's future partner Eva Kant), and Diabolik remained in prison. Five years later, after King's death, Dane became the leader of the Brotherhood and organised the rescue of his brother, but that was all a cover for his brother's murder, his real plan. Diabolik survived the assassination and swore that he will destroy the Brotherhood and his brother. Together with his partner Eva Kant, who also got personal vendetta against Dane and the Brotherhood, Diabolik manages to make life miserable to Dane and his organisation, while being pursued by Inspector Ginko.

Characters

Episodes

References

External links
 

1990s American animated television series
1990s French animated television series
1999 American television series debuts
1999 French television series debuts
1999 Italian television series debuts
2000s American animated television series
2000s French animated television series
2001 American television series endings
2001 French television series endings
2001 Italian television series endings
American children's animated action television series
American children's animated adventure television series
Anime-influenced Western animated television series
English-language television shows
Fox Kids
French children's animated action television series
French children's animated adventure television series
Italian children's animated action television series
Italian children's animated adventure television series
Jetix original programming
Television series by Disney–ABC Domestic Television
Television series by Saban Entertainment